The 1995 FIA Formula One World Championship was the 49th season of FIA Formula One motor racing. It featured the 1995 Formula One World Championship for Drivers and the 1995 Formula One World Championship for Constructors, which were contested concurrently over a seventeen-race series that commenced on 26 March and ended on 12 November. Michael Schumacher won his second consecutive Drivers' Championship, and Benetton won the Constructors' Championship, the first and only Constructors' title for the Benetton team.

He also continued his rivalry with Williams-Renault driver Damon Hill, including collisions at the British and Italian Grands Prix. Both these races were won by Schumacher's Benetton teammate Johnny Herbert, taking his first two F1 victories. Hill's Williams teammate, David Coulthard, claimed his first victory in Portugal, while Ferrari's Jean Alesi achieved his only F1 victory in Canada. Just like Honda in 1988, Renault engines won all but one race in this season.

Background
The calendar was initially announced at the beginning of 1995. The European Grand Prix moved to the Nürburgring circuit. The Argentine Grand Prix was the only newly announced race, with it taking place at the Autódromo Oscar Alfredo Gálvez circuit. The circuit was due to begin the season  on 12 March, but there were doubts over whether the circuit would be ready in time. The third race in Japan was also under threat, as the TI Circuit was badly affected after the Great Hanshin earthquake, which damaged local infrastructure. The San Marino round, Spanish round and the Italian round required safety upgrades. The Circuit de Catalunya was also in financial difficulty. On 6 February, a revised calendar was announced, with the Argentine Grand Prix moved to 9 April, despite the fact it had now received official clearance from FIA safety inspector Roland Bruynseraede. The Pacific round was moved due to the Kobe earthquake, with it now one week before the Japanese Grand Prix. The European Grand Prix was moved forward seven days, leaving just a seven-day gap between the Portuguese and European rounds. However, some tracks still needed clearance to race.

Although 14 teams and 28 drivers respectively were on the official 1995 entry list, the Larrousse team with drivers Éric Bernard and Christophe Bouchut failed to turn up for any of the on-track sessions. This was due to the team running short of money: in the period prior to the event, with French government aid not forthcoming and a 1995 chassis not yet built, team owner Gérard Larrousse elected to miss the first two rounds of the season in the hope of competing from the San Marino Grand Prix onwards. No funding ever arrived and it was too late for them to build a car for the season. There were some arrangements with the DAMS Formula 3000 team, but DAMS bosses wanted to buy Larrousse and run the team themselves. On 13 February, the boss of DAMS, Jean-Paul Driot announced that they had abandoned plans to enter Formula One for 1995, as he could not find a good amount of sponsorship to run the team at a competitive level. Larrousse's withdrawal, in addition to the collapse of the Lotus team after the end of the 1994 season, dropped the number of participating cars to 26, guaranteeing all the entrants of a race start, without the threat of failing to qualify, for the first time since the 1994 Canadian Grand Prix. The threat of a drivers' strike over the terms of the 1995 Fédération Internationale de l'Automobile (FIA) Super Licences, which allowed the FIA to demand promotional appearances and forbade the drivers from criticising the championship. This was resolved by the governing body prior to the race, ensuring full driver participation.

Of the teams that did appear, all had completely new chassis to cope with the revised Technical Regulations, which stipulated a variety of changes including the reduction of engine capacity to 3 litres, reduction in the size of aerodynamic wings, the introduction of more stringent crash testing, the raising of the cars' ride height, and more rigorous testing of fuel specifications all with the aim of reducing speeds and increasing driver safety. This process had begun in the aftermath of the deaths of Roland Ratzenberger and Ayrton Senna during the weekend of the 1994 San Marino Grand Prix. The cars were still in various stages of development heading into the new season; the Footwork FA16 and Simtek S951 chassis arrived at the event with virtually no testing, having been completed shortly beforehand. There was one new team in the shape of the Italian Forti outfit, whilst the Benetton, McLaren, Footwork, Jordan, Pacific, Ligier and Sauber teams had all changed their engine suppliers in the course of the off-season. The biggest change perhaps was made by Benetton, who after running Fords joined Williams as a Renault powered team. However, McLaren's long-term relationship with Mercedes was established in 1995 and would continue until 2014.

Of the initial 1995 drivers, Pedro Diniz was the only complete rookie, whilst Andrea Montermini started his first race after failing to qualify for the 1994 Spanish Grand Prix due to injury. Mika Salo and Domenico Schiattarella had competed in two races, with Taki Inoue competing in one race the previous season. The 1995 season also saw the debut of Jan Magnussen when he replaced regular McLaren driver, Mika Häkkinen for the 1995 Pacific Grand Prix. It was also the last season for  champion, Nigel Mansell.

Minardi had been expected to run with Mugen-Honda engines, but at the last minute, Ligier boss Flavio Briatore persuaded the Japanese engine supplier to supply Ligier, leaving Minardi in a mess. Their car was designed for the Mugen-Honda V10 and parts were already being made. The Minardi team then had to work flat out to build a brand new car with a Ford ED engine. Team owner Giancarlo Minardi announced he was taking legal action against the Japanese supplier. The status of Ligier and who its owners were was also coming under scrutiny. The news that Martin Brundle had signed with them for 1995 brought up rumours that Tom Walkinshaw was the new boss of the team. Walkinshaw's move to Ligier from Benetton (where he had been Benetton's Engineering Director) was part of the agreement between Flavio Briatore and FIA's Max Mosley the previous year to get Benetton regarding the use of an illegal fuel filter in the 1994 German Grand Prix. Benetton admitted that the filter was illegal on the understanding that major changes would be made within the team. Briatore appeared to have asked Walkinshaw to control Ligier. Controversy surrounded the Ligier JS41 car, with rival team owners comparing it to the Benetton B195 car because of their similar design, the only apparent difference being the engine in each car. Commenting on the design similarities, Walkinshaw said:

At the front of the field, Michael Schumacher and Damon Hill in the Benetton and Williams cars respectively were the favourites to battle for the Drivers' Championship, with Schumacher anticipating a "struggle" for the championship. Bernard Dudot, Renault Sport's Chief Engineer, said that he believed Benetton was less well-prepared than Williams, as the former team had changed its engine supplier to Renault, whereas Williams had been in partnership with the company since .

McLaren were also concerned about the standard refuelling equipment provided for 1995 by suppliers Intertechnique, having suffered a major leak in a test of the new rig outside of its factory. Intertechnique had redesigned the fuel equipment, which was used by all of the teams, in the wake of a pit lane fire suffered by driver Jos Verstappen during the previous year's German Grand Prix. The new fuel rigs, in addition to being half the size of the 1994, also featured longer nozzles, and were designed to lock onto the car before any fuel could begin to flow. Intertechnique traced the problem to a faulty valve within the equipment, which caused  of fuel to leak, and modified the parts accordingly.  It was only the seventeenth race since refuelling had been reintroduced to the sport at the start of the 1994 season.

Another rule revision meant that the minimum weight limit of  applied to both car and driver together. Prior to the first session of the season, all of the drivers were weighed to establish a reference weight to be used on occasions when the two were weighed separately, or if the driver was unavailable to be weighed. As such, a small competitive advantage could be established if the driver attempted to register a weight as heavy as possible, so their actual weight when driving the car would be lower.

Drivers and constructors
The following teams and drivers competed in the 1995 FIA Formula One World Championship. All teams competed with tyres supplied by Goodyear.

Team changes
 The 1995 season saw major reshuffle among the engine suppliers. Benetton ended their 7-year association with Ford Motor Company by switching to the Renault RS7 engines which were the same used by the Williams F1 team which was Renault's works team. Sauber took the Ford customer deal after parting ways with long time partner Mercedes-Benz, who elected to supply engines to McLaren. McLaren ended their relationship with Peugeot after only one season, with Jordan taking on the Peugeot full-works engines deal, replacing Hart, who began supplying Footwork Arrows for the season. Pacific Racing replaced their 1993-spec Ilmor engines for customer Ford EDC engines.
At the end of the 1994 season Team Lotus left F1 after 36 years in the sport winning 6 Drivers' and 7 Constructors' Championships with the team ceasing operations in January 1995. Shortly before the team closed doors, the team's assets were bought by David Hunt, brother of 1976 Formula One champion James Hunt, who later announced that the Lotus name will be used by Pacific Grand Prix under the name Pacific Team Lotus.
 Following increased debts after the 1994 season Larrousse left Formula One. They were originally entered for the 1995 season under the name Larrousse Junior Team with drivers Christophe Bouchut and Éric Bernard, but did not appear at any of the races. Subsequent talks about merger with Formula 3000 team DAMS fell apart. The team was also supposed to be sponsored by the Malaysian oil company Petronas, but this deal also fell through.
 Formula 3000 team Forti entered Formula One for the 1995 season. Their Forti FG01 was the last F1 car to use a manual gearbox.
Ligier underwent an ownership change for the 1995 season. The status of the team and it owners came under scrutiny by the FIA. The news that Martin Brundle had signed with them for 1995 brought up rumours that Tom Walkinshaw was the new boss of the team. Walkinshaw's move to Ligier was part of the agreement the previous year by Flavio Briatore and FIA's Max Mosley regarding Benetton's use of an illegal fuel filter in the 1994 German Grand Prix. Ligier also secured a Mugen-Honda engine deal for the season. Originally Minardi were expected to use Mugen engines, but in the last minute, Ligier boss Flavio Briatore persuaded the Japanese engine supplier to supply Ligier, leaving Minardi being forced to use customer Ford EDM engines, which were tuned by Magneti Marelli.

Driver changes

At the start of the season
Mika Salo replaced Mark Blundell at Tyrrell, with Gabriele Tarquini now the team's test driver. Before being confirmed as race driver, Salo was involved in a contract dispute with the Pacific team. The Contract Recognition Board lawyers and Tyrrell representatives were astounded when Team Lotus owner David Hunt announced to them that the Lotus name would be in Formula One in 1995, having been leased to Pacific. However, the board announced on 13 February that it had ruled in favour of Tyrrell because the Team Lotus which Salo had signed for was not the same Team Lotus which now claimed his services. Salo was unveiled as Tyrrell driver later that evening when they unveiled their 1995 car.
Williams retained Damon Hill and David Coulthard in their race seats, with Nigel Mansell leaving the team at the beginning of January.
Mark Blundell replaced fellow countryman Martin Brundle at McLaren. However, Nigel Mansell was in the McLaren seat from the San Marino Grand Prix. Mansell was reported to join McLaren ever since leaving Williams in January. However, Mansell said that the 1995 season will almost certainly be his last in Formula One. Mansell was confirmed as a McLaren driver at the end of January, but he could not fit in the car. His deal was also dropped from $15 million to $10 million because Marlboro refused to pay his asking price.
Christian Fittipaldi left Footwork at the end of 1994 and was replaced by Taki Inoue.
Simtek retained Domenico Schiattarella and brought in Jos Verstappen from Benetton with Hideki Noda the team's test driver. Noda was scheduled to be the team's first driver, but due to lack of funds due to the Great Hanshin earthquake was not able to race, and was therefore relegated to share the second drive with Schiattarella. Noda ended up not driving for the team at all as they went bankrupt after the Monaco round.
Pacific kept Bertrand Gachot as race driver, but Paul Belmondo was replaced by Andrea Montermini.
New team Forti brought in veteran Roberto Moreno along with rookie Pedro Diniz. Diniz was partly selected as his family controls one of Brazil's largest food distribution companies.
Pierluigi Martini was retained by Minardi, but Michele Alboreto was replaced by Luca Badoer.
On 28 October 1994, Ligier issued a press release stating that Olivier Panis and Johnny Herbert were going to be their official drivers for all of the 1995 season. However, at the end of January, they announced that Herbert was no longer at the team, joining Benetton instead, and that Aguri Suzuki and Martin Brundle would share the second seat. The announcement came as a big shock to Suzuki and his Japanese backers, who believed he had secured the Ligier seat for the whole season. During his "off" races, Brundle joined veteran commentator Murray Walker in the BBC commentary box as well as Jonathan Palmer. Brundle and Walker later became commentators for ITV after Brundle retired from F1 at the end of the  season. Brundle currently commentates for Sky Sports F1 alongside David Croft.

During the season
 Jan Magnussen was promoted from test driver at McLaren to replace Mika Häkkinen for the Pacific Grand Prix, due to Häkkinen suffering from appendicitis.
 Gabriele Tarquini filled in for Ukyo Katayama at the European Grand Prix as Katayama was still recovering from neck injuries and severe bruising sustained during a crash at the previous round in Portugal.

Calendar

Calendar changes
The Argentine Grand Prix  returned after a 14-year absence, it had been originally scheduled in 1994 but it was cancelled as the Autódromo Oscar Alfredo Gálvez track was still undergoing work and the owners were not finished with the project. The project was completed in time for 1995 with the race held on 9 April.

The Pacific Grand Prix was originally scheduled for 16 April, but was moved to 22 October due to the effects of the Great Hanshin earthquake.

The Spanish Grand Prix and Monaco Grand Prix swapped places on the calendar so that the Monaco round follows the Spanish Grand Prix.

The European Grand Prix moved from the Circuito Permanente de Jerez to the Nürburgring, it was the first time since 1985 that a F1 race was held at the Nürburgring.

Season review
The 1995 F1 season featured several dramatic incidents, including seven Grands Prix affected by rain and four Grands Prix which were red-flagged on the first lap of the race.

The Formula One regulations underwent several changes prior to the 1995 season. The most significant change was to the engine capacity, which was reduced from 3.5 litres to 3.0 litres in order to reduce horsepower. Higher sidepods were required, together with raised cockpit side protection (above shoulder height; to be raised even more for ) and a larger cockpit opening than that of the 1994 cars. The front and rear wings were reduced in depth to lessen downforce, thereby reducing cornering speeds. The overall height of the car was also lowered. Deformable structures, particularly the sidepods and nose section, were subject to more stringent crash testing. Many of these changes were in reaction to the deaths of Roland Ratzenberger and Ayrton Senna at the 1994 San Marino Grand Prix, who both died of head and neck injuries. Some of the circuits were also changed, with larger run-off areas featuring at tracks such as Monza and Imola.

The Benetton team had Renault V10 engines for the first time, after running Ford V8s for several years. Michael Schumacher won nine out of the seventeen Grands Prix, and won his second World Championship. Schumacher's main title rival was Damon Hill, who was driving for Williams-Renault. Hill and Schumacher were involved in some very close battles at numerous races, including at the 1995 Belgian Grand Prix, where the two championship contenders fought wheel-to-wheel for extended periods. They would use V10s in 1996.

Damon Hill received criticism during 1995, after several incidents that were attributed to driving errors. The 1995 British Grand Prix was overshadowed by a controversial collision between Hill and Schumacher, and Hill was widely blamed for the accident. Hill also suffered with mechanical problems in his Williams-Renault.

Jean Alesi won the 1995 Canadian Grand Prix, which was his first and only victory in Formula One. Alesi also nearly won the European, Italian and Japanese Grand Prix, only being passed by Schumacher with a few laps to go in the former, and retiring with a wheel bearing and driveshaft failure in the latter two, respectively.

Nigel Mansell made a brief return to Formula One with McLaren. The McLaren-Mercedes cockpit was initially too small for Mansell, and he had to miss the first two races whilst McLaren redesigned the monocoque. His eventual return for the 1995 San Marino Grand Prix was disappointing, and he was outpaced by Häkkinen. After another disappointing race at the Spanish Grand Prix Mansell and McLaren parted ways, and Mark Blundell drove the second McLaren for the remainder of 1995. Mika Häkkinen suffered serious head injuries after a high-speed crash during the first qualifying session on the Friday of the 1995 Australian Grand Prix. Later that year, Mansell revealed that he intended to "fight for the championship with Williams", but the Williams team chose David Coulthard instead.

One of the rookies for 1995 was Taki Inoue who drove for Footwork Arrows. During the first qualifying session for the 1995 Monaco Grand Prix his car stalled on the track, and the session was stopped in order to recover the car. A course car driven by Jean Ragnotti was travelling too fast and Ragnotti was unsighted by the barriers on the twisty circuit. Ragnotti's car crashed into Inoue's stranded car, flipping the Arrows. Inoue was knocked unconscious but he recovered and took part in the race on Sunday. At the 1995 Hungarian Grand Prix Inoue's car retired with a mechanical problem. He got out of his car and grabbed a fire extinguisher in order to put out a small fire on his car. Inoue then walked into the path of a course car, and was knocked over. Inoue bounced off the front of the car and collapsed on to the grass. He suffered minor leg injuries.

Results and standings

Grands Prix

Points scoring system

Points were awarded to the top six finishers in each race as follows:

World Drivers' Championship standings

Notes:
 – Driver did not finish the Grand Prix but was classified, as he completed more than 90% of the race distance.

World Constructors' Championship standings

Notes:
 – Driver did not finish the Grand Prix but was classified, as he completed more than 90% of the race distance.

Non-championship event results
The 1995 season also included a single event which did not count towards the World Championship, the Formula One Indoor Trophy at the Bologna Motor Show.

Notes

References

External links

formula1.com – 1995 official driver standings (archived)
formula1.com – 1995 official team standings (archived)
1995 FIA Formula One World Championship – Drivers positions at web.archive.org (archived)
1995 FIA Formula One World Championship – Constructors placings at web.archive.org (archived)

Notes

Formula One seasons